Kyle Chapman  is a New Zealand far-right political activist and the former national director of the New Zealand National Front (NZNF), a white nationalist political party. He has stood unsuccessfully three times for the Christchurch mayoralty: first for the NZNF (2004); then for the National Democrats Party (2007); and then for the Resistance Party (2013).

Chapman founded Right Wing Resistance, a neo-Nazi group, in 2009. He said in March 2019 that he was no longer interested in such politics, and was focused on his family and spirituality, although at least one commentator was sceptical of this.

Personal life
Chapman was born in Taumarunui, New Zealand.

In May 2009 Chapman married Claire Clifford, a Mormon, but they separated in October of the same year; Chapman had vowed to give up his far-right activities but Claire ended the relationship when he did not.

Activities
Chapman was the founding member of the New Zealand Hammerskins.

He was convicted of fire-bombing a marae during the late 1980s and early 1990s. He admitted to hurling Molotov cocktails at various buildings, including Ngāi Tahu Murihiku Marae and a school.

In January 2009 an email was sent out concerning Chapman's plans to create a European culture "protected community" in North Canterbury. The email stated that his intention was to "build a unified mini state that we could build up in future to be a base for other like minded Europeans to come to from other dying countries". The email claimed the compound would have a school, accommodation, a meeting house for leaders, and a training area for sport fighting and survival training.

Running for offices
In 2004, he unsuccessfully contested the mayoralty of Christchurch, New Zealand, placing 5th out of 10 with 1.9 percent of the vote (1665 votes).

In 2005, he was the tenth-ranked list candidate for the Direct Democracy Party. The party, which only contested the 2005 general election, did not achieve representation.

He unsuccessfully contested the Christchurch mayoralty again in 2007, running this time under the National Democrats ticket.

In 2013, Chapman ran again for the Christchurch mayoralty, but was unsuccessful, securing 499 votes. He also ran for the Ferrymead-Pegasus Local Board, securing 641 votes, but was also unsuccessful there.

Turning his back on politics
After the 2019 Christchurch mosque shootings Chapman said he had "fallen out" with others in groups he used to belong in and "turned his back" on them to focus on family and religion. This was disputed by a holocaust historian, who said his statement was "an object lesson in the tactics these groups use to legitimise themselves through media manipulation".

COVID-19 pandemic
On the 20th of August 2021, Chapman and two other individuals appeared in the Christchurch District Court after they broke COVID-19 lockdown restrictions to protest those restrictions the day before in Christchurch. The three individuals were remanded in custody on charges of failing to comply with restrictions under the COVID-19 Public Health Response Act 2020.

Organisations

National Front 
Chapman is a former leader of the New Zealand National Front, leading the organisation from 1997 to 2005. In 2005, he resigned his role as the leader of the National Front. He said in interviews that his children were being shunned at school due to his activities. He also cited the harassment by left wing anti-NZNF groups as a factor in his departure.

Right Wing Resistance

In 2009 Chapman founded the Right Wing Resistance, a neo-Nazi group, in Christchurch with a group of white nationalists. Chapman reportedly knighted the members with a sword after they recited a pledge. The group's insignia was a skull over a Wolfsangel, with the notation "NA 14". Its introduction to the New Zealand public was its Christchurch street patrols in October 2009, which appeared to target Polynesian youths. RWR members engaged in street patrols in New Brighton with the stated purpose of preventing vandalism by youth street gangs. The mayor of Christchurch denounced their vigilante behavior. Its street patrols included from 5 to 15 members, who had shaved heads. Also in October 2009, Chapman organized a rally at the Wellington cenotaph.

The group attempted to recruit further members in Auckland. Press coverage resulted from distributions of flyers comparing immigration to an invasion, which were called "despicable" by the Race Relations Commissioner. It also helped organise protests and other street activities alongside the National Front.

During the 2011 general election campaign, members of the group disrupted a candidate's election meeting in Christchurch appearing in military-style clothing. They stated that they would protest at polling booths throughout New Zealand on election day; however, this did not happen.

After the March 2019 Christchurch mosque shootings Chapman said he was no longer involved with this group.

Right Wing Resistance was reported in November 2019 to have chapters in Australia, Sweden and Scotland. There is an Australian far-right extremist group called Right Wing Resistance Australia, said to have "international connections".

Survive Club
Chapman founded and led the Survive Club, a survivalist group that denied being a militia and having any racist ties despite the histories of some of its members.

Election results

References

External links
 Kyle Chapman's blog

New Zealand activists
1971 births
Living people
Alt-right politicians in Oceania
People from Christchurch
Leaders of political parties in New Zealand
New Zealand National Front politicians
National Democrats Party politicians
Direct Democracy Party of New Zealand politicians
Neo-Nazism in New Zealand
New Zealand fascists
Unsuccessful candidates in the 2005 New Zealand general election
People from Taumarunui